A cartridge trap is a type of booby trap devised by the Viet Cong and subsequently used against American and other anti-Communist forces supporting South Vietnam during the Vietnam War. It derives its name from the fact that the wounding component of the trap is a small arms cartridge.

Design
It is a very simple trap, made from four main components: a bamboo pipe, a piece of wood, a nail and a small arms cartridge. The device required a cartridge to be stood upright and when a person (usually a soldier) stepped on the trap, the pressure placed on the bullet would force it down onto a nail, igniting the primer and subsequently causing the round to fire.

Purpose
The intent of the trap was to cause the round to travel through an enemy soldier's foot, causing him and probably his entire section to cease their actions to treat him. This would often create an opportunity for a Vietcong (or other North Vietnamese force) to engage the stationary section in an ambush.

See also
 Punji stick
 NLF and PAVN battle tactics
 Combat Engineers

References

Guerrilla warfare tactics
Area denial weapons